Sami Gabriel David David (born 5 April 1950) is a Mexican politician affiliated with the Institutional Revolutionary Party. As of 2014 he served as Deputy of the LII, LIV and LIX Legislatures of the Mexican Congress and as Senator of the LVI and LVII Legislatures as a plurinominal representative.

References

1950 births
Living people
Politicians from Chiapas
Members of the Senate of the Republic (Mexico)
Members of the Chamber of Deputies (Mexico)
Presidents of the Chamber of Deputies (Mexico)
Presidents of the Senate of the Republic (Mexico)
Institutional Revolutionary Party politicians
20th-century Mexican politicians
21st-century Mexican politicians
National Autonomous University of Mexico alumni